Kevin Marion (born July 24, 1984) is a former professional American and Canadian football wide receiver. He was signed by the Pittsburgh Steelers as an undrafted free agent in 2008. He played college football for the Wake Forest Demon Deacons.

Marion played for the Montreal Alouettes of the Canadian Football League.

External links
Montreal Alouettes bio

1984 births
Living people
Players of Canadian football from St. Petersburg, Florida
American players of Canadian football
Canadian football wide receivers
American football wide receivers
Wake Forest Demon Deacons football players
Pittsburgh Steelers players
Montreal Alouettes players
Players of American football from St. Petersburg, Florida
Harrisburg Stampede players